Petar Asenov Petrov (Bulgarian: Петър Петров; born 19 April 1984) is a Bulgarian professional footballer who plays as a midfielder for Oborishte Panagyurishte.

Honours

Club
Rabotnički Skopje
First Macedonian League: 2013–14

References

External links
 

1984 births
Living people
Bulgarian footballers
Bulgarian expatriate footballers
PFC Minyor Pernik players
FC Montana players
FC Vitosha Bistritsa players
FK Rabotnički players
FC Botev Vratsa players
FC Lokomotiv 1929 Sofia players
FC Oborishte players
First Professional Football League (Bulgaria) players
Second Professional Football League (Bulgaria) players
Macedonian First Football League players
Expatriate footballers in North Macedonia
Association football midfielders